Ramanaidu "Rana" Daggubati (born 14 December 1984) is an Indian actor and producer known primarily for his work in Telugu language films, in addition to Hindi and Tamil languages. Rana is described as one of the few actors in India who were able to achieve pan-Indian appeal, having taken up a variety of roles, from leading roles to supporting characters, in different languages.

He made his acting debut with the Telugu film Leader, for which he won the Filmfare Award for Best Male Debut – South. He later starred in the Hindi film Dum Maaro Dum (2011), alongside Bipasha Basu, where he received positive reviews for his performance and won Zee Cine Award for Best Male Debut. In 2012, Rana gained prominence by starring in hit Telugu film Krishnam Vande Jagadgurum. In 2015, he played a notable supporting role in the successful Hindi film Baby (2015). He later starred as Bhallaladeva, the main antagonist in Telugu–Tamil bilingual film Baahubali: The Beginning (2015), which recorded the second highest gross opening for an Indian film. He then featured in a supporting role in Tamil film Bangalore Naatkal (2016). In 2017, Rana later reprised his role as Bhallaldeva in Baahubali 2: The Conclusion, which became the highest grossing Indian film of all time. He has also simultaneously starred in the successful films such as Rudramadevi (2015), Ghazi (2017), and Nene Raju Nene Mantri (2017).

As a visual effects producer, Rana won the State Nandi Award for Best Special Effects in 2006 for the Telugu film Sainikudu. In 2006, he received the National Film Award for co-producing Bommalata. Rana is also an established television personality, hosting award shows such as the 2nd IIFA Utsavam, the South Indian International Movie Awards. He also hosts his own celebrity talk show, No. 1 Yaari. Alongside building a career in cinema, Rana is invested in businesses ranging from a business accelerator programme for technology startups, to an entertainment agency and a comic book company.

Mr Daggubati became the board member of Mumbai Academy of the Moving Image.

Early life and family 
Ramanaidu Daggubati was born in Madras (present-day Chennai), Tamil Nadu to Telugu film producer D. Suresh Babu. He is named after his paternal grandfather D. Ramanaidu, a prominent Telugu film producer. A member of the Daggubati–Akkineni family, his paternal uncle Venkatesh and his cousin Naga Chaitanya are also actors. Rana revealed in 2016 that he is blind in his right eye, and his left eye is a transplanted one. The surgery was done in L. V. Prasad Hospital, Hyderabad. Another surgery was done on his right eye when he was 14, but was unsuccessful.

Rana did his schooling in Chennai and Hyderabad from Chettinad Vidyashram and Nalanda Vidya Bhavan High School respectively. He later studied at St. Mary's College, Hyderabad. Rana holds a degree in the Industrial photography. He lives with his family in Hyderabad. He also owns a house in Mumbai.

Acting career

2010–2012: Debut and breakthrough 
Rana's debut film as an actor was Leader (2010), in Telugu, directed by Shekhar Kammula, which is one of his highest grossers. He plays the role of an aspiring Chief minister of Andhra Pradesh. The opened to rave reviews from critics with his performance too getting praise. A critic from The Times of India stated that "Another lineage star RaNa takes his first bow at the BO with an inspiring political saga, a far cry from the formula-ridden films that his ilk usually begin with including his uncle and star Venkatesh." His performance in the film fetched him two awards – Filmfare Award for Best Male Debut – South and CineMAA Award for Best Male Debut. Rana made his Hindi debut with the film Dum Maaro Dum, which released on 22 April 2011.The Times of India called it a "dashing debut". Taran Adarsh commented that "Much of the joy comes from watching Rana Daggubati infuse believability into his character. He's easy on the eyes and is a complete natural when it comes to acting. Bipasha shines in several moments of the film." He won Zee Cine Award for Best Male Debut for his performance in the film.

In his next Telugu film, Nenu Naa Rakshasi (2011), he played a professional killer Abhimanyu alongside Ileana D'Cruz, under Puri Jagannadh's direction, which was a box-office bomb. A reviewer of NDTV wrote that "Rana's attempt to prove himself as a commercial hero has not taken off and he should wait for another break."

Rana has three releases in 2012. His first release of the year was the romantic action film Naa Ishtam. News 18 credited it as Rana's first "full-length commercial film." Radhika Rajamani of Rediff.com, in her review of the film, praised Rana' performance and criticized the screenplay. His next film was Department, directed by Ram Gopal Varma. The film received mixed response from critics and was declared as a box-office bomb. His last release of the year was Krishnam Vande Jagadgurum, directed by Krish, which became a box office success, also receiving critical acclaim. he plays the role of a theatre artist who later meets Devika (Nayanthara). an informer of the CBI, and takes revenge on Redappa/Chakravarthy (Murali Sharma/Milind Gunaji). A critic noted his performance as "brilliant" and "commendable". Karthik Pasupulate of The Times of India felt that, his performance in the film is his best one to date and is a few notches above everything else he's done to date. In July 2012, Rana signed do a "special appearance" in the film Arrambam, which his Tamil cinema debut.

2013–2017: Baahubali and beyond 
The year 2013 was one of the busiest ones in his career. Rana has made cameo appearances in three films – Sundar C.'s Something Something, Ayan Mukerji's Yeh Jawaani Hai Deewani and Vishnuvardhan's Arrambam, with the latter being his Tamil debut. The same year, he joined two big-budget productions, Gunasekhar's Rudhramadevi and S. S. Rajamouli's Baahubali: The Beginning, in which he is the lead antagonist. Both the films have been released in 2015. Rana didn't have a single release in the following year.

In 2015, he starred in the Hindi film Baby, alongside Akshay Kumar and Taapsee Pannu. Rana played Bhallaladeva, the cousin of Baahubali (Prabhas), in the 2015 film Baahubali: The Beginning, which is part of Baahubali franchise. His character became widely popular and received unprecedented appreciation from critics. Rana was inspired by Daniel Day-Lewis to play the character. He described the film as "career-defining" for him.  Baahubali: The Beginning was released worldwide in July 2015 and was the highest-grossing film in India at the time of its release. Made on a production budget of ₹ 180 crore, the film collected a worldwide gross of ₹650 crore at the box office. The film gained him several awards, including Nandi Award for Best Villain and SIIMA Award for Best Actor in a Negative Role (Telugu). The film started a new film movement named Pan-India films. He has next appeared in the film Rudhramadevi. It is a 3D biographical action film based on the life of Rudrama Devi, in which he played the role of Chalukya Veerabhadra. Although, the film didn't performed well at the box-office, it received mixed reviews from the critics. Pranita Jonnalagedda felt that his character in the film is "underused". The same year, he appeared himself in a cameo role in Dongaata (Telugu), Size Zero (Telugu) and Inji Iduppazhagi (Tamil).

The following year, he has been part of the ensemble cast of the Tamil film Bangalore Naatkal, which is a remake of 2014 Malayalam film Bangalore Days. In 2017, he did India's first underwater Telugu-Hindi bilingual film, Ghazi. The film's plot is based on the mysterious sinking of PNS Ghazi during the Indo-Pakistani War of 1971, in which he played Lieutenant Commander Arjun Varma. He shot for 18 days in the underwater. Hindustan Times's Gautaman Bhaskaran wrote that "Daggubati is wonderfully restrained – a complete changeover from the kind of parts he has been playing so far". Several other critics also praised his performance in the film.

Rana reprised his role in the second part of the film series of Baahubali franchise, that is, Baahubali 2: The Conclusion. The film started the 1000 Crore Club in the Indian cinema. It is currently the second highest-grossing Indian film and the 39th highest-grossing film of 2017 with a gross of  ₹1,810 crore. He spent a total of 250 days shooting both the films of the series over five years. His  performance and the character Bhallaladeva was well praised, with critics calling it "terrific", "scheming villain". A critic of News18 stated that he has "made an indelible impact on the viewers." He won two major awards, Filmfare Award for Best Supporting Actor – Telugu and SIIMA Award for Best Actor in a Negative Role (Telugu). He further did a Telugu film Nene Raju Nene Mantri in which he plays a politician with grey shades, alongside Kajal Aggarwal. In an interview to Gulf News, director Teja said that "I wanted Joginder to dress like M. G. Ramachandran and have included some traits of MGR in Joginder's life". This film too received positive reviews for Rana's acting and screen presence. Hemanth Kumar, writing for Firstpost, called his performance "terrific" and added that "it is a performance that we won't forget anytime soon."

Rana next began shooting for the Telugu-Tamil bilingual film 1945. However, in September 2019, he called it an "unfinished film," while also adding that: "producer defaulted on money." He also signed the mythological film Hiranyakashyapa directed by Gunasekhar, in 2017. Although as of October 2020, the film stands temporarily shelved owing to the COVID-19 pandemic. He announced his next film Kaadan (in Tamil; Aranya in Telugu; Haathi Mere Saathi in Hindi) on 14 December 2017, directed by Prabhu Solomon.

2018–present: Experimental roles and future projects 
In 2018, he made a cameo appearance in the Hindi comedy film Welcome to New York. In March 2018, he joined the production of two-part N. T. Rama Rao biographical film series. He played the role of ex-chief minister of Andhra Pradesh N. Chandrababu Naidu in the two films – NTR: Kathanayakudu and NTR: Mahanayakudu, which were released in January 2019 and February 2019. Both the films were box-office bomb and received mixed reviews from the critics. He next appeared in a dual role in the Hindi film Housefull 4 and made a cameo appearance in the song "Naan Pizhaippeno" of the Tamil film Enai Noki Paayum Thota.

Rana's much awaited film, Kaadan (in Tamil; Aranya in Telugu) was released in March 2021, after twice rescheduling its release date. Owing to the COVID-19 pandemic in India, the release of Hindi version Haathi Mere Saathi has been postponed. Tamil and Telugu versions, however, are released as scheduled. Rana shed 30 kilograms to look lean for his role in the film. Haricharan Pudipeddi of Hindustan Times appreciated Rana's performance, calling it "one of his best till date." The Hans India called his performance "exceptional".

Rana has two films released in 2022, the action thriller Bheemla Nayak and period action drama Virata Parvam. He began filming for the Bheemla Nayak, co-starring Pawan Kalyan in January 2021. Rana will star in Netflix series Rana Naidu alongside his uncle Venkatesh, in an official adaptation of American crime drama show Ray Donovan.

Production 

Before establishing as an actor, he started his own production company, Spirit Media. He produced a National Film Award-winning film and then forayed into acting in 2010. Rana leads Ramanaidu Studios, a production house. He not only manages the studio business as well as the production house, Suresh Productions, alongside his father, but is also invested in many other businesses as well.

Business ventures and other works 

Five years before turning into an actor, in 2005, Rana entered the visual effects business with Spirit Media P. Limited. The company that specialised in animation and VFX, produced special effects for over 70 films.

Along with the films, he also starred in a web series called Social. Since 2017, Rana is the host of the Telugu Television talk-show No. 1 Yaari. The show has completed four seasons over a span of five years, which brought celebrities such as Vijay Deverakonda, S.S. Rajamouli, Nani, Kajal Aggarwal, Naga Chaitanya, Tamannaah, Rakul Preet Singh, Ram Pothineni, Navdeep, Nikhil Siddharth, and others. He also dubbed for the character Thanos in the Telugu dubbed version of Avengers: Infinity War.

In 2018, he entered into a joint venture with Kwan Entertainment and Marketing Solutions. Set up as a studio style agency, Kwan South's divisions include talent management casting, live performances and appearances, film packaging, production support- TV and Commercials, brand associations- endorsements, digital and film partnerships. It was expanded with an office in Chennai.

Following the business venture, in the same year, he tied up with Anthill Ventures, an investment and scaling platform for early growth stage start-ups, to launch Anthill Studio. Anthill Studio is a business accelerator program focused on technology startups in Media & Entertainment. The studio supports and mentors disruptive startups in leading-edge technologies such as Artificial intelligence (AI), augmented reality and virtual reality (AR/VR), blockchain, visual effects (VFX), cloud rendering, machine learning (ML), internet of things (IoT) and big data and analytics.

In 2019, he bought a stake in the one of India's leading comic book companies, Amar Chitra Katha and turned director to the company that is backed by Future Group. In March 2019, he opened a learning centre for art and design, life skills, performing arts and vedic science and ethics in Hyderabad. The same year, he acquired the co-ownership of Hyderabad FC, a professional football club based in Hyderabad. The club competes in the Indian Super League. After acquiring ownership, Rana stated "Hyderabad has a great legacy with the sport. This team, therefore, is a chance to rekindle that legacy."

Rana has launched his own YouTube channel SouthBay.Live on 15 November 2020. Reportedly, the channel streams various content including podcasts, fiction and non-fictions unscripted shows, live chat shows, music, animation, etc.

In 2022, Rana launched a men's grooming platform named DCRAF in association with Roposo. DCRAF is a part of Roposo's Glance digital initiative.

Personal life and media image 

Rana got engaged to his girlfriend, Miheeka Bajaj, founder of Dew Drop Design Studio, on 20 May 2020 at Ramanaidu Studios. They married on 8 August 2020 at Ramanaidu Studios. He is an eggetarian.

Rana has appeared in Forbes India's Celebrity 100 list in 2017 at the 36th position. He was ranked twentieth on the Times' 50 Most Desirable Men for the year 2011, tenth in 2012, thirteenth in 2013, seventeenth in 2014, eleventh in 2015, twenty-fourth in 2016, seventh in 2017, nineteenth in 2018, thirteenth in 2019, and twenty-eighth in 2020. For the year 2011, he was voted "The Most Promising Newcomer of 2011" for the same poll. He was ranked twenty-ninth in Eastern Eye's "Sexiest Asian Men", in 2015. In 2011, he was featured in GQ India's Best Dressed Men list. Owing to the similarities between the Hulk and the character Bhallaladeva, Rana is often called as the "Hulk of Tollywood". He was the eleventh most searched celebrity in 2017, on Google Search.

Rana have signed endorsement deal with Ubon in 2020 and with CEAT in 2021. In addition, he has been the brand ambassador of Telugu Titans in the Pro Kabaddi League. On 1 June 2021, Sony Pictures Networks India have launched the sports channel Sony Ten 4, for which Rana was signed as the brand ambassador and promoter.

Awards and nominations 

National Film Awards
National Film Award for Best Feature Film in Telugu – Co-producer (Spirit Media) – Bommalata (2006)

Filmfare Awards South
Filmfare Award for Best Male Debut – South – Leader (2010)
Filmfare Award for Best Supporting Actor – Telugu – Baahubali 2: The Conclusion (2018)

Nandi Awards
Nandi Award for Best Special Effects (Spirit Media) – Sainikudu (2006)
Nandi Award for Best Villain – Baahubali: The Beginning (2015), Baahubali 2: The Conclusion (2017)

Zee Cine Awards
Zee Cine Award for Best Male Debut – Dum Maro Dum (2011)

SIIMA Awards
SIIMA Award Youth Icon of South Indian Cinema (2011)
SIIMA Award for Best Actor (Critics) – Krishnam Vande Jagadgurum (2012)
SIIMA Award for Best Actor in a Negative Role (Telugu) – Baahubali: The Beginning (2016)
SIIMA Award for Best Actor in a Negative Role (Telugu) – Baahubali 2: The Conclusion (2018)
Entertainer of the Year: Rana Daggubati – Baahubali 2: The Conclusion / Ghazi / Nene Raju Nene Mantri

IIFA Awards
IIFA Award for Best Actor (Negative role) – Baahubali: The Beginning (2015)
Asiavision Movie Awards
AsiaVison Movie Award for Best Actor (From south) – Baahubali: The Beginning (2015)

CineMAA Awards
CineMAA Award for Best Male Debut – Leader (2010)
CineMAA Award for Best Villain – Baahubali: The Beginning (2015)
Santosham Film Awards

 Santosham Best Villain Award – Baahubali: The Beginning (2015)

References

External links 
 
 

Indian male film actors
Nandi Award winners
Visual effects artists
Visual effects supervisors
Special effects coordinators
Indian male voice actors
Male actors in Telugu cinema
Male actors in Tamil cinema
1984 births
Living people
Filmfare Awards South winners
Male actors from Chennai
Indian people with disabilities
21st-century Indian male actors
Telugu film producers
Film producers from Chennai
Santosham Film Awards winners
Zee Cine Awards winners
Male actors from Hyderabad, India
Indian television talk show hosts